Aticama is a small farming and fishing community in the state of Nayarit, Mexico.  It is situated approximately 90 miles north of Puerto Vallarta and near the town of San Blas on a stretch of coastline known as the Riviera Nayarita.  Aticama's beach is known as Playa Matanchen and is one of the widest and sandiest beaches in Mexico. Aticama is an important producer of rock oysters, shrimp, rock lobster, and fish such as mahi mahi and robalo.  It is also a major producer of mangos and bananas. In colonial times, it was a haven for pirate ships and buccaneer on the Pacific coast.

Over the past ten years, Aticama has developed an expatriate community from Canada and the United States.  Most of the community members live in the area of town known as El Cerrito, also known as Gringo Gulch, which has views of Matanchen Bay and the Sierra Madre Occidental Mountains. Many of the houses can be seen along the cliff overlooking Matanchen Beach.

References

Populated places in Nayarit